Jerry Bartholomew Sullivan (January 1, 1859 – April 17, 1948) was a judge of the United States Customs Court and a member of the Board of General Appraisers.

Education and career

Born on January 1, 1859, in Mount Pleasant, Iowa, Sullivan read law and entered private practice in Creston, Iowa from 1882 to 1904. He was city attorney for Creston from 1887 to 1889. He continued private practice in Des Moines, Iowa from 1904 to 1913.

Federal Judicial Service

Sullivan was nominated by President Woodrow Wilson on April 17, 1913, to a seat on the Board of General Appraisers vacated by Thaddeus S. Sharretts. He was confirmed by the United States Senate on April 28, 1913, and received his commission on April 29, 1913. He served as president from 1914 to 1925. Sullivan was reassigned by operation of law to the United States Customs Court on May 28, 1926, to a new Associate Justice seat (Judge seat from June 17, 1930) authorized by 44 Stat. 669. His service terminated on September 30, 1939, due to his retirement. He was succeeded by Judge Thomas Joseph Walker.

Death

Sullivan died on April 17, 1948.

References

Sources
 

1859 births
1948 deaths
Judges of the United States Customs Court
People from Mount Pleasant, Iowa
Members of the Board of General Appraisers
United States Article I federal judges appointed by Woodrow Wilson
20th-century American judges
People from Creston, Iowa
United States federal judges admitted to the practice of law by reading law